Jens Henschel (born 18 September 1964, in Zeitz) is a German former professional footballer who played as a striker.

Henschel made 50 appearances in the DDR-Liga and 12 appearances in the 2. Fußball-Bundesliga during his playing career.

References

External links
 

1964 births
Living people
People from Zeitz
People from Bezirk Halle
East German footballers
German footballers
Footballers from Saxony-Anhalt
Association football forwards
DDR-Oberliga players
2. Bundesliga players
Hallescher FC players
1. FC Frankfurt players
1. FC Union Berlin players
Tennis Borussia Berlin players
Berliner FC Dynamo players
SV Babelsberg 03 players